Alex Ketrzynski (born 9 August 1960) is a Canadian volleyball player. He competed in the men's tournament at the 1984 Summer Olympics.

References

External links
 

1960 births
Living people
Canadian men's volleyball players
Olympic volleyball players of Canada
Volleyball players at the 1984 Summer Olympics
Volleyball players from Toronto